Attorney General Raney may refer to:

George P. Raney (1845–1911), Attorney General of Florida
William Raney (1859–1933), Attorney General of Ontario